The Tarasque is a fearsome legendary dragon-like mythological hybrid from Provence, in southern France, tamed in stories about Saint Martha, such as the one told in Jacobus de Voragine's Golden Legend (13th century).

The tarasque was described as having a lion-like head, a body protected by turtle-like carapace(s), six feet with bear-like claws, and a scaly tail like a serpent's tail in a text (pseudo-Marcelle or pseudo-Marcella) which is similar to and roughly coeval with the Golden Legend, and issued poison breath according to one hagiography (pseudo-Raban Maur) of perhaps somewhat later date.

Medieval iconography such as renditions in church sculpture did not necessarily conform to this description in the earlier Gothic period, and examples which seemed to were later assigned later, 14th century dates. The hexapedal carapaced tarasque was the form depicted on the city seal of Tarascon around the 15th century, and this held to be the norm in 16th- and 17th-century paintings. As St. Martha purportedly encountered the beast in the act of swallowing a human victim, it has become a stock motif in art to portray the beast swallowing a human head first, with the victim's legs still dangling.

According to tradition, in 1474 René of Anjou initiated the use of the tarasque in the Pentecostal festival, and later used also on the saint's feast day of July 29. Yearly celebration in the last weekend of June was added in the modern day. The effigy or float of the tarasque has been built over the years for parading through town for the occasion, carried by four to a dozen men concealed inside.

Legend 

The legend of the Tarasque probably arose in Provence, France, from early to late 12th century. The legend is recorded in several sources, but especially in the story of St. Martha in the Golden Legend (Legenda aurea), which was "the most influential".

Legenda aurea 
In Provence, France, the creature inhabited the forested banks of the Rhône between Arles and Avignon, around what is now the town Tarascon (then called Nerluc or 'black place'), but lurked in the river and attacked the men trying to cross it, sinking boats. The creature was described a dragon, half animal, half fish, thicker than an ox, longer than a horse, with "sword-like teeth".

The Tarasque was said to have come from Galatia, a cross-breed between the biblical Leviathan and the legendary Onachus (or onacho, or bonacho) of Galatia, this onachus being a creature that retaliated against pursuers by flinging its dung like an arrow, and causing burns. The people besought Saint Martha for help, and she found the creature in the act of devouring a man. Merely by sprinkling holy water and holding up the cross, she caused the creature to become submissive and obedient. She then tied her girdle (to its neck), leading the beast to the villagers who cast rocks and spears at it until it died.

Other sources 

The account of St. Martha and the tarasque in the Golden Legend (LA) roughly correspond to the versions of the legend found in the pseudo-Marcella ("V"), and in Vincent de Beauvais's Speculum historiale ("SH"). are near contemporaneous works (late 12th and 13th century), with the pseudo-Marcella probably being the oldest, and dating "between 1187 and 1212 or 1221". The three texts LA, SH, and V are similar in content with only modest variations.

There is also a fourth variant Latin account, a "Life of St. Mary Magdalene and her sister St. Martha" (Vita Beatae Mariae Magdalenae et sororis ejus Sanctae Marthae) with somewhat divergent content from the other three, whose authorship had formerly been credited to Raban Maur (d. 856 AD), but since rejected as a false attribution, being the work of an unknown author perhaps as early as the late 12th century, or as late as the second half of the 13th century. The work is referred to as the "pseudo-Raban" by Louis Dumont and others.

There is also a brief notice on the tarasque which occurs in Gervase of Tilbury (Gervais de Tilbury). Gervase assigns the habitat of the tarasque to be an abyss near the city-gates of Arles and the rock/cliff beneath the castle/fort at Tarascon.

Description 

As for the description of the tarasque's physical appearance given in the Legenda aurea, it is given a somewhat dissimilar treatment in the corresponding passage in the c. 1200 pseudo-Marcella:

This description is said to "correspond rather closely" to 17th and 18th century iconography in paintings and woodcuts and to the modern-day effigy. Even the turtle-like carapaces ( "shields") is attested in this c. 1200 piece of writing, even though some commentators ventured it to be a 15th-century addition, created out of expedience to conceal the men carrying the beast's effigy paraded through town for the Pentecostal festivities.

The head has later been described as being similar to a bull and a lion or having the muzzle/face of a lion, or, having the head of a lion with a black mane.

Tail 

The "tail of a serpent" detail is given in both the Pseudo-Marcella and the Speculum Historiale. The tail was "long and ringed and looked considerably like that of the scorpion" in a lost sculpture on a face of an old church (Église Sainte-Marthe de Tarascon) according to surgeon-author . It is a ringed tail, and does turns upright as can be verified in facsimile sketch of the sculpture printed by Faillon. Some modern-day authors have gone a step further, claiming the tarasque's tail ended in a scorpion sting. Or rather, the tail terminated in a (cock's)  according to writer Jean-Paul Clébert. There has also been past comment that the tail should end in an arrowhead's shape, according to tradition.

Poison breath 
The pseudo-Raban speaks at length of the poisonous fumes exhaled by the tarasque:

Rather than its eyes literally shooting flames, some French sources take it to be a figure of speech, that "its eyes glare sulfurously". One source (Abbé François Canéto) has Raban Maur stating that the poison breath shot out of the tarasque's nostrils in thick vapours.

Medieval depictions

Heraldry and numismatics
The Tarasque is featured on the coat of arms of Tarascon, and here too, the beast/dragon is depicted as devouring a human, at least in later versions of the seal. In 11th or 12th century seals of the city, the tarasque is given an appearance of a crocodile or some sort of amphibian according to one opinion. The city seal from the 13th century appears much as a plain dragon according to one 18th century writer on medieval coats of arms, though Faillon counters that this represents not a dragon guarding the city, but the tarasque. This early type perhaps dates to as far back as the 11th century, seen on seals struck on méreau type tokens. The later design of the seal depicting the tarasque with a (turtle-like) carapace appeared in the 15th century.

Later design of the city seal distinctly shows the tarasque swallowing a human. In the language of heraldry, the coat of arms has been described as featuring "below [the castle with crenelated towers argent] a dragon of sinople devouring a man and covered with scales of gold".

Illuminated manuscripts 
In late medieval manuscripts the monster is often depicted devouring people.

Architecture 

There are also depictions in architecture.

The aforementioned sculpture once incorporated into the right side exterior of Église Sainte-Marthe de Tarascon purportedly dated to the 11th century, and counted as the oldest representation recorded. This sculpture of the tarasque depicted the beast in the act of devouring a human, in typical fashion. This tarasque was a quadruped that bore close resemblance to the beast trodden underfoot by St. Martha in the paneling sculpture of the choir stalls at Cathédrale Sainte-Marie d'Auch, according to Abbé François Canéto.

Another example is the carving of a The tarasque in the Montmajour Abbey near Arles.

Yet another is carved in the capital column of the Church of St. Trophime (Église Métropolitaine de Saint-Trophime) in Arles, dating to the mid-14th century, though earlier commentators, such as Faillon who supplied detailed drawings of the capital, considered it to be an example of early Gothic art from the 11th century.

Festivities

The festival of the tarasque was initiated on April 14, 1474 during Pentecost in Tarascon, at the behest of René of Anjou, in order to amuse his citizens with a reenactment of St. Martha's miracle. Later, a second festival was held on 29 July, the feast-day of Saint Martha.

In former days, the effigy of the tarasque was paraded through the streets twice a year, and a maiden portraying St. Martha escorting the tarasque held it by the leash (or a white ribbon) in one hand.

In the modern day (post-World War II), the festival came to be held annually on the last Sunday of June, to tell the tale of the Tarasque, as well as Tartarin, the main character of Alphonse Daudet's Tartarin de Tarascon.

19th century descriptions 

The tarasque paraded through the streets once changed from a wooden prop painted green to a metallic contraption in the early 19th century. Aubin-Louis Millin (1808) described the tarasque effigy as wooden, and consisting of hoops covered in painted cloth. German writer Christian Friedrich Mylius (1818) elaborated that "Every year on the 2nd day of Pentecost, a grotesque wooden likeness of the dragon, or the Tarasque, is carried through the city; it resembles a turtle; it consists of a wooden framework covered with wax canvas, painted apple-green, with gilded hooks and thorns on its back". A tarasque used in the jeu de tarasque during the Pentecostal festival is described by the Count of Villeneuve in 1826, as an effigy of a "monstrous dragon, whose torso is assembled from hoops covered with a painted sheet metal, and whose back is made using a huge shield to imitate a turtle's carapace. The paws are clawed, the tail scaly and several times curved, the head is like a bull and a lion. A gaping mouth reveals several rows of teeth".

The wooden hull described in 1818 required 8 men to carry, the metallic version needed 12 men. The tarasque of the festival of 1846 concealed 4 porters inside, and the one in 1861 needed 6 men.

The head could be manipulated by a person inside, making the effigy's jaws open or close; from out of its nostrils fuses or rockets were made to poke out and ignited so it issued fiery sparks.

It later became established that the jeu de Tarasque would commence at Pentecost and continue to the feast day of Saint Martha on July 29, or the festival was held on those 2 days as two acts.

Modern-day effigy 

By the 20th century, the tarasque effigy used in Tarascon was mounted on a wheeled cart, which are dragged or pulled by persons known as Tarascaïres, and these attendants of the tarasque could intermittently break off and engage in dance (farandole).

Dates of observation 
In the past the festivals were only held sporadically in a major way, e.g., in the years 1846, 1861, 1891 and 1946 but since 1946 they have become a yearly event and tourist attraction.

In the gap years (first half of the 20th century) when the jeu de Tarasque was in hiatus, different authorities were claiming different weeks and weekdays around Pentecost Sunday for the proper day for the ceremony, according to Eliza Gutch (d. 1931)'s paper, published posthumously.

A tarasque feast was held on a non-traditional day on 23 June 1946 in Tarascon, for practical reasons. Subsequently, the holding of the tarasque festival in this last Sunday or weekend of June became annually recurrent.

The Tarasque was designated one of "Processional Giants and Dragons in Belgium and France" listed in November 2005 as part of UNESCO's Masterpieces of the Oral and Intangible Heritage of Humanity.

In Spain 

The Tarasca (Spanish for Tarasque) is one of the statues of the Corpus Christi procession, paraded through a number of Spanish and Catalan cities, and elsewhere throughout the Iberian peninsula, for example, the cities of Granada, Toledo, and Valencia, and the city of Madrid.

The first record of the tarasca legend in the peninsula comes from Seville in the year 1282, shortly after the reconquista of the city in the mid-13th century.

The Spanish version is tinged with misogynistic elements, or rather repudiations against biblical and historical temptresses, with statues and statuettes of such female figures (called "") surmounted on top of the tarasca dragon. The figure atop the Granada dragon is a life-size doll resembling a retail store mannequin, and the tiny blonde-hair figurine set atop the papier-mâché tarasca of Toledo is supposed to represent Anne Boleyn.

But in 1637 the boy was replaced by a well-adorned woman, and in 1639 it was prescribed that she should be an ugly old woman.

The word tarasca has entered the Spanish vocabulary in the sense of an ill-natured woman, or a "hussy". A 19th-century dictionary defines the tarasca as a "crooked, ugly, lewd, and impudent woman", and the word is known to have been used in the sense of "ugly old woman" in the 16th century.

Theories

Parallels 

Parallels have been drawn with the French legends of the Graouilli in Metz, and the Gargouille of Rouen defeated by St. Romanus.

A legendary dragon or dragon-like marine creature reported to have appeared in Vietnam's Halong Bay has been called the "Tarasque" after the famed creature of Tarascon.

Celtic origin hypothesis 

A pre-Christian Celtic origin for the legend has been proposed, and endorsed by some writers.

French archeologist Isidore Gilles proposed the pre-Christian pagan origins for the legend of the tarasque, and connected with the so-called "tarasque of Noves", unearthed at the village Noves, once called "Tarasconnet". The find was a stone statue of a sharp-toothed chimeric beast with a scaly back, "crunching a human arm in its mouth". Gilles postulated this was a Celtic deified beast to which human sacrifices were offered.

Gilles's theory was embraced by the Provençal poet Frederic Mistral, and Dumont was disinclined to dismiss Mistral's belief altogether. French scholar  also states that the Saint Martha legend is undoubtedly "superimposed on old beliefs of Celtic paganism".

See also 

 Tarasque, a towed 20 mm anti-aircraft gun (53 T2) used by the French military
 Tarrasque, a monster in Dungeons & Dragons
 Bowser
 Tarascosaurus, a dinosaur named after the Tarasque
 Mont Gerbier de Jonc
 Gargouille of Rouen
 Graouilli
 Peluda
 Coco or coca

Explanatory notes

References

Citations

Bibliography

 
 
 
 
 
 
 
 
 
 ; Volume 2 (1848); 
 
 
 
 

 
 
 
 

 
  (translation)
 
 
 
 </ref>
 
 
 
 
 
 
  
 ; copy via Google

External links
 Tarasque Tudela - Navarra - Spain

Bouches-du-Rhône
Christian folklore
Christian legendary creatures
European dragons
French legendary creatures
Mythological hybrids
Masterpieces of the Oral and Intangible Heritage of Humanity